Emamabad-e Sistaniha (also Romanized as Emāmābād-e Sīstānīhā; also known as Emāmābād and Āvānsīyeh) is a village in Katul Rural District, in the Central District of Aliabad County, Golestan Province, Iran. At the 2006 census, its population was 276, in 64 families.

References 

Populated places in Aliabad County